Michael James Skinner (born November 22, 1977) is an American former professional stock car racing driver. He is the son of former NASCAR driver Mike Skinner, and brother of Dustin Skinner. He currently races Pro Late Models at tracks such as New Smyrna Speedway.

Personal life
Skinner was arrested on November 2, 2000 on multiple drug charges, including trafficking in cocaine by possession. He was arrested a second time on February 3, 2001, for possession of Ketamine.

Motorsports career results

NASCAR
(key) (Bold – Pole position awarded by qualifying time. Italics – Pole position earned by points standings or practice time. * – Most laps led.)

Busch Series

Craftsman Truck Series

References

External links
 

1977 births
Living people
NASCAR drivers
People from Randleman, North Carolina
Racing drivers from North Carolina